"Blaze of Glory" is a song written by Danny Morrison, Johnny Slate, and Larry Keith, and recorded by American country music artist Kenny Rogers.  It was released in November 1981 as the third single (following "I Don't Need You" and "Share Your Love With Me") from the album Share Your Love. The song reached number 66 on the Billboard Hot 100 chart in early 1982. The song peaked at number nine on the country chart.

Background and writing
Razzy Bailey originally cut the song to be a single, and right up until the last minute, Kenny Rogers' organization said there were no plans to release his version first. Apparently someone heard Razzy's cut on the song and rushed back to the Liberty Records to tell them it might be a hit. So Rogers' version hit the charts first and Bailey's remained an album cut from Feelin' Right.

Chart performance

References

1981 singles
1981 songs
Razzy Bailey songs
Kenny Rogers songs
Songs written by Danny Morrison (songwriter)
Songs written by Johnny Slate
Liberty Records singles